Cynthia Nonyelum Sember ( Ofili; born 5 August 1994) is an American-born British track and field athlete, specialising in sprint hurdles. She finished fourth in the 100 metres hurdles final at the 2016 Olympic Games as a 22 year old. but suffered significant injury set backs thereafter which interrupted most of the next Olympic cycle. Her first major international medal, a silver at the 2021 European Athletics Indoor Championships sparked a return to form and fitness that saw her finish fifth at the 2022 World Athletics Championships, and secure bronze for England at the 2022 Commonwealth Games, her first senior outdoor medal. She made the final of the same event at the 2022 European Athletics Championships but a stumble left her in 8th position in her third major final of the year.

Her time in the World Championships semi-finals, 12.50, is a British record in the outdoor event. Her 12.38 from the final is the fastest time ever run by a British athlete in the event, but was wind-assisted.

Domestically, Sember is a two time British champion in the 100 mete hurdles.

Biography

Ofili is a native of Ypsilanti, Michigan, and the younger sister of fellow hurdler Tiffany Porter (née Ofili); as her mother is British and her dad-Nigerian, she was born with American, Nigerian, and British citizenship. In 2014, her sophomore year at the University of Michigan, Ofili qualified for the 60 m hurdles final at the NCAA indoor championships, placing sixth in a personal best 8.07; outdoors, she broke 13 seconds in the 100 m hurdles for the first time, winning the Big Ten conference championship in 12.93. In addition to hurdling, she competed in the sprints, setting Michigan indoor school records at both 60 metres (7.37) and 200 metres (23.69).

Ofili's times improved in 2015, and she became a leading collegiate hurdler; at the NCAA outdoor championships in Eugene she placed second in a personal best 12.60, losing only to Keni Harrison of Kentucky. She also qualified for the NCAA championship meet in the flat 100 m, but despite running a school record 11.39 she was eliminated in the semi-finals in that event.

Ofili could have chosen to internationally represent either the United States, Great Britain or Nigeria (her father's country of origin); in June 2015 it was announced that she had selected Britain, following her older sister Tiffany Porter. The move caused some controversy in Britain, with detractors labeling Ofili a "plastic Brit"; Ofili, who unlike her sister had not represented the United States as a junior, stated she felt British. At the 2015 British championships Ofili placed second to Porter in 12.96, qualifying to represent Britain later that summer at the IAAF World Championships in Beijing.

Ofili finished fourth in the 100m hurdles final at the 2016 Rio Olympics, in 12.63 secs.

She became a double British champion when successfully defending her title and winning the 100 metres hurdles event at the 2020 British Athletics Championships in a time of 13.16 sec.

Sember began competing under her married name of Cindy Sember from the 2021 season onwards.

International competitions

References

External links

1994 births
Living people
Sportspeople from Ypsilanti, Michigan
Track and field athletes from Michigan
British female hurdlers
American female hurdlers
Olympic female hurdlers
Olympic athletes of Great Britain
Athletes (track and field) at the 2016 Summer Olympics
World Athletics Championships athletes for Great Britain
British Athletics Championships winners
Michigan Wolverines women's track and field athletes
American people of British descent
American sportspeople of Nigerian descent
Athletes (track and field) at the 2020 Summer Olympics
Commonwealth Games bronze medallists for England
Commonwealth Games medallists in athletics
Athletes (track and field) at the 2022 Commonwealth Games
Medallists at the 2022 Commonwealth Games